The voiced uvular trill is a type of consonantal sound, used in some spoken languages. This consonant is one of several collectively called guttural R.

Features
Features of the voiced uvular trill:

 Unlike in tongue-tip trills, it is the uvula, not the tongue, that vibrates.

Occurrence

There are two main theories regarding the origination of the uvular trill in European languages. According to one theory, the uvular trill originated in Standard French around the 17th century and spread to the standard varieties of German, Danish, Portuguese and some of those of Dutch, Norwegian and Swedish. It is also present in other areas of Europe, but it is not clear if such pronunciations are due to French influence. In most cases, varieties have shifted the sound to a voiced uvular fricative  or a voiced uvular approximant .

The other main theory is that the uvular R originated within Germanic languages by the weakening of the alveolar R, which was replaced by an imitation of the alveolar R (vocalisation). Against the "French origin" theory, it is said that there are many signs that the uvular R existed in some German dialects long before the 17th century.

Apart from modern Europe, uvular R also exists in some Semitic languages, including North Mesopotamian Arabic and probably Tiberian Hebrew.

See also 
 Index of phonetics articles

Notes

References

External links
 

Trill consonants
Uvular consonants
Pulmonic consonants
Oral consonants
Central consonants